Marjorie Evasco (born September 21, 1953) is a Filipina poet. She writes in two languages: English and Cebuano-Visayan and is a supporter of women's rights, especially of women writers. Marjorie Evasco is one of the earliest Filipina feminist poets. She is a recipient of the S.E.A. Write Award.

Biography
Born in Maribojoc, Bohol into a family of teachers who were "always talking English", she was brought up and educated as a Roman Catholic and her formative years in school were spent under the tutelage of German and Belgian nuns. Evasco and her family lived in Tacloban City and Dumaguete City, then moved to Manila in 1984. She finished her B.A. in 1973 from Divine Word College of Tagbilaran, Masteral Degree in Creative Writing in 1981 at Silliman University and her Doctor of Philosophy in Literature (Ph.D. Litt.) at De La Salle University-Manila. In 1984, she became a member of the faculty at De La Salle University, and completed her doctoral degree in 1998. For many years, she was Director of De La Salle University's Bienvenido N. Santos Creative Writing Center (BNSCWC). She is currently a University Fellow and Professor Emeritus for Literature at the same university.

Works

Evasco's poetry books are: Dreamweavers: Selected Poems 1976-1986 (1987) and Ochre Tones: Poems in English and Cebuano (1999). "Dreamweavers" was launched in 1987 at the UP Writers Workshop in Diliman, Quezon City, in Tagbilaran City, and in Dumaguete City at the Sillman University National Writers Workshop. Ochre Tones was launched in May 1999 at National Artist Edith L. Tiempo's residence on Montemar (Sibulan, Negros Oriental) and at the Filipinas Heritage Library in Makati City. Evasco calls this volume a " book of changes," following Dreamweavers which for her was a " book of origins."

Her other poetry collections are "Skin of Water" poems in English with their Spanish translations done by Filipino, Spanish, and Latin-American translators; and "Peces de luz/ Fishes of Light," a volume of tanrenga in English and Spanish with Venezuelan-Cuban poet Alex Fleites. 

Evasco's other books include A Legacy of Light: 100 Years of Sun Life in the Philippines, Six Women Poets: Inter/Views (co-authored, with Edna Manlapaz), Kung Ibig Mo: Love Poetry by Women (co-edited with Benilda Santos), A Life Shaped by Music: Andrea O. Veneracion and the Philippine Madrigal Singers,ANI: The Life and Art of Hermogena Borja Lungay, Boholano Painter, and "Valentina's Valor: Stories from the Life and Times of Valentina Galido Plaza."

Evasco was a founding member of two organizations espousing the cause of women writers: Writers Involved in Creating Cultural Alternatives (WICCA) and Women in Literary Arts (WILA). She has written many essays on women's poetry, several of them finding their place in various anthologies.

She served as editor of a special issue of Ani in 1998 that featured writings and art work by Filipino women. She also edited the book on place and memory of her home-island called "The Bohol We Love: Memoirs of Growing Up Boholano." in 2017. In this memoir, she also translated works in Binisayang Bol-anon into English. 

In Spring 1991, she was given a writing residency at Hawthornden Castle: International Writers' Retreat and a travel bursary from the British Council. And in April-May 1992, she enjoyed a writing residency at the Bellagio Studies Center of the Rockefeller Foundation in Lake Como, Italy. In September 2002, she was invited for a three-month residency at the International Writing Program in the University of Iowa.

She is an associate fellow of the Philippine Literary Arts Council (PLAC), a member of Philippine PEN, and a lifetime member of the Writers' Union of the Philippines (UMPIL).

Awards

Evasco has received several literary awards from the Carlos Palanca Memorial Awards for her essays. For her books, she has garnered the National Book Awards from the Manila Critics' Circle, and the Gintong Aklat for Dreamweavers'' (Book Development Association of the Philippines). For her poems, she has won several major prizes from the Philippine Free Press. 

Her poems in English and Binisaya (Cebuano-Visayan) have appeared in many important anthologies including Luna Caledonia, "Agam: Filipino Narratives of Uncertainty and Climate Change,""Sustaining the Archipelago: Anthology of Philippine Ecopoetry," "The First Five: New Literature by Southeast Asian Writers," and the Norton anthology "Language for a New Century: Poems from the Middle East, Asia, and Beyond" (Eds. Ravi Shankar, Tina Handal, et al). She has been published extensively in Asia, Europe and North America and her works have been translated into various Philippine languages and world languages, the latest of which was Italian. 

She has also participated in various writers' festivals such as the 10th Vancouver International Writers' Festival in 1997; the Southeast Asian Writers' festival at the University of Malaya Cultural Centre in Kuala Lumpur, Malaysia in 2003; the Wordfeast 1st Singapore International Literary Festival in 2004, the Man Hong Kong Literary Festival in 2006. the XVIII International Poetry Festival in Medellin, Colombia in 2008, the 2010 Granada Festival Internacional de Poesia in Granada, Nicaragua, and the 2021 online edition of the Festival Internacional de la Lectura Yucatan (FILEY) where she read with Yucateca writer Sol Ceh Moo and Spanish translator Perla Coll Ehrenberg.

References

External links
 Marjorie Evasco by Ed Farolan
 Ochre Tones by Marjorie Evasco
 Writers in Conversation – Marjorie Evasco and R. Zamora Linmark
 Gray November by Marjorie Evasco
 Elemental by Marjorie Evasco
 Origami by Marjorie Evasco
 DLSU Bienvenido Santos Creative Writing Center
  Wordfeast Singapore
 The Man Hong Kong International Literary Festival 2006
 41st Dumaguete National Writers’ Workshop
 NCCA Writers’ Prize 2005
 Literary Readings By Philippine Writers at the University of Hawaii Manoa
 2003 Dumaguete National Writers’ Workshop by Ian Casocot
 2006 Iyas Creative Writing Workshop by Rolly Espina

Writers from Bohol
De La Salle University alumni
Living people
Filipino feminists
Boholano people
1953 births
Filipino women poets
International Writing Program alumni
Silliman University alumni
20th-century Filipino women writers
20th-century Filipino poets
21st-century Filipino women writers
21st-century Filipino poets